is a Japanese amateur astronomer who has discovered hundreds of asteroids, most of them in collaboration with Kazuro Watanabe, placing him among the most prolific discoverers of minor planets.

Career in astronomy 
Kin Endate was born in Iwaizumi in Iwate Prefecture and went to Hokkaido Designers School to study photography. He began taking astrophotos in high school, but did not begin serious asteroid observations until 1986.

His notable discoveries include the minor planets (5648) 1990 VU1 and  6500 Kodaira, a Jupiter trojan  and the Mars-crosser, respectively. He also recorded the first known precovery images of Comet Shoemaker-Levy 9 with his private  diameter telescope on March 15, 1993, ten days before the official discovery of the comet. Kin, who was looking specifically for asteroids, did not know of the comet in his images until after the official discovery.

Awards and honors 

The main-belt asteroid 4282 Endate, discovered by his colleagues Seiji Ueda and Hiroshi Kaneda at Kushiro in 1987, was named in his honor. The official naming citation was published by the Minor Planet Center on 8 July 1990.

List of discovered minor planets 

Most asteroids were discovered by Kin Endate in collaboration with  Kazuro Watanabe

See also

References 
 

1960 births
Discoverers of asteroids

20th-century Japanese astronomers
Living people
21st-century Japanese astronomers